There is a German national population residing in Alabama, and historically there was a German immigrant population.

In 1866, the German immigrants founded Cullman, Alabama.

Wernher von Braun, formerly affiliated with Nazi Germany, helped establish the space industry in Huntsville, Alabama.

The German companies began widespread business operations in Alabama when Mercedes-Benz established its first assembly plant in the U.S. in Alabama, Mercedes-Benz U.S. International; in 1993 it selected Vance, a town west of Birmingham, and east of Tuscaloosa.

The Alabama State German Evangelical Holiness Pentecostal Church was founded in 1935 by Rev. Dorothy Forrest Trumbo and her husband, Charles Ross Trumbo, after the fall of the German United Protestant Church of The South, in Fyffe, Alabama.

References

Further reading

Articles
"German companies are at home in Alabama." NBC News. May 20, 2007.
German Guide to Alabama - Alabama/Germany Partnership
Poe, Kelly. "Germans came to build cars, but they got a lesson on Alabama." AL.com. January 24, 2015.
"Ten years after Mercedes, Alabama town still pans for gold." Savannah Morning News. Wednesday, October 9, 2002.
Cloos, Paul. "Mobile County wins ThyssenKrupp plant." AL.com. May 11, 2007. Updated May 12, 2007.
Nelson-Gabriel, Melissa. "Massive Thyssenkrupp steel plant in Calvert being sold for an estimated $1.55 billion." Associated Press at the Tuscaloosa News. Thursday December 26, 2013.

Books

External links
"Cullman: Alabama's German Village" - State of Alabama Tourism Website
 Friends of German Culture Collection, The University of Alabama in Huntsville Archives and Special Collections

History of Alabama
Alabama